Alexander Hamilton (born 22 July 1865) was a Scottish footballer who played as an outside right for Queen's Park, Corinthian and Rangers, and represented Scotland four times.

Hamilton was the eldest of three brothers to play for Scotland, the others being Gladstone and James.

References

Sources

1865 births
Year of death missing
Association football outside forwards
Scottish footballers
Scotland international footballers
Corinthian F.C. players
Queen's Park F.C. players
Rangers F.C. players
Footballers from Glasgow
FA Cup Final players